Wandy is a given name. Notable people with the name include:

Wandy Peralta (born 1991), Dominican professional baseball pitcher
Wandy Rodríguez (born 1979), Dominican professional baseball pitcher
Wandy Williams (born 1946), American football player